Fas ligand (FasL or CD95L or CD178) is a type-II transmembrane protein expressed on cytotoxic T lymphocytes and  natural killer (NK) cells. Its binding with Fas receptor (FasR) induces programmed cell death in the FasR-carrying target cell. Fas ligand/receptor interactions play an important role in the regulation of the immune system and the progression of cancer.

Structure 
Fas ligand or FasL is a homotrimeric type II transmembrane protein that belongs to the tumor necrosis factor (TNF) family. It signals through trimerization of FasR, which spans the membrane of the target cell. This trimerization usually leads to apoptosis, or programmed cell death.

Soluble Fas ligand is generated by cleaving membrane-bound FasL at a conserved cleavage site by the external matrix metalloproteinase MMP-7.

Receptors 
FasR: The Fas receptor (FasR), or CD95, is the most intensely studied member of the death receptor family. The gene is situated on chromosome 10 in humans and 19 in mice.  Previous reports have identified as many as eight splice variants, which are translated into seven isoforms of the protein.  Many of these isoforms are rare haplotypes that are usually associated with a state of disease. Apoptosis-inducing Fas receptor is dubbed isoform 1 and is a type 1 transmembrane protein. It consists of three cysteine-rich pseudorepeats, a transmembrane domain, and an intracellular death domain.
DcR3: Decoy receptor 3 (DcR3) is a recently discovered decoy receptor of the tumor necrosis factor superfamily that binds to FasL, LIGHT, and TL1A. DcR3 is a soluble receptor that has no signal transduction capabilities (hence a "decoy") and functions to prevent FasR-FasL interactions by competitively binding to membrane-bound Fas ligand and rendering them inactive.

Cell signaling 
Fas forms the death-inducing signaling complex (DISC) upon ligand binding. Membrane-anchored Fas ligand trimer on the surface of an adjacent cell causes trimerization of Fas receptor.  This event is also mimicked by binding of an agonistic Fas antibody, though some evidence suggests that the apoptotic signal induced by the antibody is unreliable in the study of Fas signaling. To this end, several clever ways of trimerizing the antibody for in vitro research have been employed.

Upon ensuing death domain (DD) aggregation, the receptor complex is internalized via the cellular endosomal machinery. This allows the adaptor molecule Fas-associated death domain (FADD) to bind the death domain of Fas through its own death domain. FADD also contains a death effector domain (DED) near its amino terminus, which facilitates binding to the DED of FADD-like ICE (FLICE), more commonly referred to as caspase-8. FLICE can then self-activate through proteolytic cleavage into p10 and p18 subunits, of which two form the active heterotetramer enzyme. Active caspase-8 is then released from the DISC into the cytosol, where it cleaves other effector caspases, eventually leading to DNA degradation, membrane blebbing, and other hallmarks of apoptosis.

Some reports have suggested that the extrinsic Fas pathway is sufficient to induce complete apoptosis in certain cell types through DISC assembly and subsequent caspase-8 activation.  These cells are dubbed Type 1 cells and are characterized by the inability of anti-apoptotic members of the Bcl-2 family (namely Bcl-2 and Bcl-xL) to protect from Fas-mediated apoptosis. Characterized Type 1 cells include H9, CH1, SKW6.4, and SW480, all of which are lymphocyte lineages except the latter, which is of the colon adenocarcinoma lineage.

Evidence for crosstalk between the extrinsic and intrinsic pathways exists in the Fas signal cascade. In most cell types, caspase-8 catalyzes the cleavage of the pro-apoptotic BH3-only protein Bid into its truncated form, tBid. BH-3 only members of the Bcl-2 family engage exclusively anti-apoptotic members of the family (Bcl-2, Bcl-xL), allowing Bak and Bax to translocate to the outer mitochondrial membrane, thus permeabilizing it and facilitating release of pro-apoptotic proteins such as cytochrome c and Smac/DIABLO, an antagonist of inhibitors of apoptosis proteins (IAPs).

Soluble FasL is less active than its membrane-bound counterpart and does not induce receptor trimerization and DISC formation.

Functions 

Apoptosis triggered by Fas-Fas ligand binding plays a fundamental role in the regulation of the immune system. Its functions include:
T-cell homeostasis: the activation of T-cells leads to their expression of the Fas ligand. T cells are initially resistant to Fas-mediated apoptosis during clonal expansion, but become progressively more sensitive the longer they are activated, ultimately resulting in activation-induced cell death (AICD). This process is needed to prevent an excessive immune response and eliminate autoreactive T-cells. Humans and mice with deleterious mutations of Fas or Fas ligand develop an accumulation of aberrant T-cells, leading to lymphadenopathy, splenomegaly, and lupus erythematosus.
Cytotoxic T-cell activity: Fas-induced apoptosis and the perforin pathway are the two main mechanisms by which cytotoxic T lymphocytes induce cell death in cells expressing foreign antigens.
Immune privilege: Cells in immune privileged areas such as the cornea or testes express Fas ligand and induce the apoptosis of infiltrating lymphocytes. It is one of many mechanisms the body employs in the establishment and maintenance of immune privilege.
Maternal tolerance: Fas ligand may be instrumental in the prevention of leukocyte trafficking between the mother and the fetus, although no pregnancy defects have yet been attributed to a faulty Fas-Fas ligand system.
Tumor counterattack: Tumors may over-express Fas ligand and induce the apoptosis of infiltrating lymphocytes, allowing the tumor to escape the effects of an immune response. The up-regulation of Fas ligand often occurs following chemotherapy, from which the tumor cells have attained apoptosis resistance.

Role in disease 
Defective Fas-mediated apoptosis may lead to oncogenesis as well as drug resistance in existing tumors. Germline mutation of Fas is associated with autoimmune lymphoproliferative syndrome (ALPS), a childhood disorder of apoptosis.

Increases in Fas-mediated signaling have been implicated in the pathology of low-risk myelodysplastic syndromes (MDS) and glioblastoma.

More recently, FasL-mediated apoptosis of T cells has also been suggested as an immune-evasive mechanism by which tumors can suppress T cell infiltration similar to inhibitory immune checkpoints such as PD-1 and CTLA-4.

Clinical Significance 
Therapeutic rationales for the suppression of Fas signaling in the context of glioblastoma and myelodysplastic syndromes (MDS) have led to the development of the Fas fusion protein asunercept (APG101) that is currently in clinical development for these indications.

Interactions 
Fas ligand has been shown to interact with:

 CASP8, 
 EZR, 
 FADD, 
 FNBP1, 
 FYN, 
 FAS, 
 Grb2, 
 PACSIN2,  and
 TNFRSF6B.

See also 
FAF1

References

Further reading

External links 
   GeneReviews/NCBI/NIH/UW entry on Autoimmune Lymphoproliferative Syndrome
 
 
 

Clusters of differentiation
Immune system
Programmed cell death
Signal transduction